Ramesh Shil (1877 – April 6, 1967) was a Bengali bard. He belonged to the class of bards, called Kabiyals, who improvised songs in poetic contests evolved in Calcutta and its outskirts in the 18th and the 19th centuries, and also became known for his composition of songs in the Maizbhandari musical tradition. He was awarded Ekushey Padak in 2002 by the Government of Bangladesh.

Background and career
Shil was born to Chandi Charan Shil and Rajkumari Shil. Shil got his breakthrough in 1945 when he defeated Sheikh Gumani in a song contest arranged by the Nikhil Bharat Banga Sahitya Sammelan in Calcutta. In the contest, they improvised verses and hurled strophes and antistrophes at each other.

Works
Shil composed about 350 Maizbhandari songs praising the Maizbhandari order and its proponent Ahmed Ullah Maizbhandari. These songs had been published in nine volumes titled Ashekmala, Shantibhandar, Muktir Darbar, Nure Duniya, Jibansathi, Satyadarpan, Bhandare Maula, Manab Bandhu and Eshke Sirajia.

Shil wrote notable songs like "Ishkul Khuilachhe Re Maula".

Bulbul Lalitakala Academy honored him as the Greatest Bard in 1962.

Personal life
Shil first married Apurba Mohini in 1900. They had one daughter Shailbala. After early deaths of next two daughters and one son, he married for the second time. From the second marriage with Abola Bala, they had four sons and two daughters.

References

1877 births
1967 deaths
Bengali male poets
People from Chittagong
Recipients of the Ekushey Padak
19th-century Bengali poets
19th-century Indian male writers
Musicians in British India